Sandra L. Hofferth is a Professor, the Department of Family Science, University of Maryland School of Public Health in the United States, and Director, Maternal and Child Health Bureau. She is the former co-director of the Michigan Panel Study of Income Dynamics and founding Director of its Child Development Supplement. Her research focuses on American children's use of time; poverty, food insecurity, public assistance, and child health and development; and fathers and fathering. Hofferth is the author of more than 100 articles and five books. Dr. Hofferth studies employment and parenting among women and most recently has extended this interest to men. Her current research focuses on the transition of young men to adulthood, particularly disadvantaged young men. Her papers have examined the link between the timing of childbirth and relationship outcomes for young men, factors influencing the transition of young men into residential and nonresidential fatherhood, the consequences of children for young men's relationships, and how young men's and their partners' employment experiences affect their relationships with children.

Education 

She received her B.A. in  Sociology and Psychology from Swarthmore College in June 1967. Fellowships: NIMH Traineeship in Social Psychology, 1967–1968 and 1970–1972.

She then M.A. in sociology from The University of North Carolina, Chapel Hill, in August 1971. Thesis: "Cooperation and Competition in Peasant Communities" (Chairman: Henry A. Landsberger)

She received her Ph.D. in sociology at the University of North Carolina, Chapel Hill, in August 1976. Dissertation: "Modeling the Contraceptive Behavior of Couples: An Exchange Approach" (Chairman: J. Richard Udry)

Biography 
Sandra Hofferth, Professor in the Department of Family Science at the University of Maryland, is a former Director of the Maryland Population Research Center (2008–2012) and a former co-director of the Michigan Panel Study of Income Dynamics. She was Vice President of the Population Association of America in 2010. Her research interests are in American children's use of time and later health outcomes, work, and family, fathers and fathering, and family policy. She has published on the effects of racial/ethnic disparities at the individual and neighborhood levels on father (and mother) involvement and child outcomes and published a series of papers on social capital. Dr. Hofferth has researched family issues in the context of public policy for over thirty years, publishing three books and more than 100 articles and book chapters. She recently completed a project funded by NICHD that examined the timing of and consequences of parenthood for men and women. Besides her deep knowledge of large national databases, she has expertise in measurement, methods, and structural equation modeling. Her most recent book is the Handbook of Measurement Issues in Family Research. She is the Principal Investigator on an NICHD-funded grant, the American Time Use Survey Data Extract System, which provides advanced extracting capabilities for seven years of time use data on individual time expenditures and on family time allocations to activities across a 24-hour period.

Research 
Much of Hofferth's research focuses on children's time, including estimates of children's media, studying, and sports participation time as well as estimates of time children spend with their mothers and fathers. Results to date include large increases over the past 5–6 years in computer and video game use and declines in active sports participation and outdoor leisure activities among 6-12 year olds. She has also found evidence that early participation in sports (when children are 6–12) is associated with a lower risk of overweight when they are 13–18. In the area of fathers and fathering, Hofferth completed two papers that examined the association between marital status, the biological relationship of the father, involvement with children and child development (Journal of Marriage and the Family and Demography). Drawing from the Child Development Supplement to the Panel Study of Income Dynamics, these papers used innovative methods to test whether family structure differences in father involvement were due to selectivity of men into families or to actual differences in parenting. In the public policy area, Hofferth examined the impact of U.S. parental leave statutes on the employment of new mothers after childbirth in a paper with S. Curtin (Work and Occupations 2006). Hofferth's work on welfare reform and public policy over the past decade is summarized in the Spring 2002 issue of Contexts: Understanding People in their Social Worlds, a journal of the American Sociological Association. Hofferth demonstrated that welfare reform policies, particularly the work requirement, contributed to the increased exits of single mothers from AFDC in the mid-1990s (Population Research and Policy Review 2002). Returns to public assistance tended to result from changes in personal circumstances rather than public policies (Social Science Research 2005). Hofferth, like many others, failed to find an effect of welfare reform policies such as family caps on nonmarital childbearing (Population Research and Policy Review 2006). Finally, Hofferth found no evidence of either poor children being more likely to be overweight or that food programs contribute to overweight among poor children (Journal of Policy Analysis and Management 2005).

Honors and awards
 In 2012, Hofferth received the Distinguished Career Award from the Family section of the American Sociological Association for her research.
 Author of more than 100 articles and book chapters, with publications in such journals as Journal of Marriage and the Family, Population Research and Policy Review, Child Development, Journal of Policy Analysis & Management, Journal of Family Issues, Demography, Social Science Quarterly, Pediatrics, Work and Occupations, and Young Children.
 Director, Maryland Population Research Center.

References

External links

Living people
University of North Carolina at Chapel Hill alumni
Swarthmore College alumni
Year of birth missing (living people)